The United Central Luzon Athletic Association (UCLAA) is an association of colleges and universities in Central Luzon region aiming to showcase the skills of student-athletes in different sports. It was formally introduced in 2015 in San Fernando, Pampanga coinciding with the formal opening of the 8th season.

It is one of the member leagues of the Philippine Collegiate Champions League (PCCL).

Members
As of 2017, its membership includes:
University of Assumption-Pampanga
Holy Angel University
System Philippines College Foundation
Guagua National Colleges

Bulacan
 Bulacan State University

Pampanga
 University of the Assumption
 Guagua National Colleges
 Holy Angel University
 Systems Plus College Foundation

Zambales
 Lyceum of Subic Bay

References

2015 establishments in the Philippines
Student sport in the Philippines
Sports organizations established in 2015